The Billboard Music Award for Top Latin Artist recognizes the most successful Latin artists over the past year. Colombian performer Shakira was the first female artist to win the accolade in 2011 and also won the following year in 2012. Puerto Rican singer and songwriter Bad Bunny is the only artist to have one the accolade three years back to back. American performer Jenni Rivera is the only artist to win the award posthumously, following her death in 2012. American performer Prince Royce is the most nominated artist without a win, with five unsuccessful nominations.

References

Billboard awards
Latin music awards